The litre (international spelling) or liter (American English spelling) (SI symbols L and l, other symbol used: ℓ) is a metric unit of volume. It is equal to 1 cubic decimetre (dm3), 1000 cubic centimetres (cm3) or 0.001 cubic metre (m3).

The original French metric system used the litre as a base unit. The word litre is derived from an older French unit, the litron, whose name came from Byzantine Greek—where it was a unit of weight, not volume—via Late Medieval Latin, and which equalled approximately 0.831 litres. The litre was also used in several subsequent versions of the metric system and is accepted for use with the SI, although not an SI unit—the SI unit of volume is the cubic metre (m3). The spelling used by the International Bureau of Weights and Measures is "litre", a spelling which is shared by most English-speaking countries. The spelling "liter" is predominantly used in American English.

One litre of liquid water has a mass of almost exactly one kilogramme, because the kilogramme was originally defined in 1795 as the mass of one cubic decimetre of water at the temperature of melting ice. Subsequent redefinitions of the metre and kilogramme mean that this relationship is no longer exact.

Definition

A litre is a cubic decimetre, which is the volume of a cube 10 centimetres × 10 centimetres × 10 centimetres (1 L ≡ 1 dm3 ≡ 1000 cm3). Hence 1 L ≡ 0.001 m3 ≡ 1000 cm3; and 1 m3 (i.e. a cubic metre, which is the SI unit for volume) is exactly 1000 L.

From 1901 to 1964, the litre was defined as the volume of one kilogram of pure water at maximum density (+4 °C) and standard pressure. The kilogram was in turn specified as the mass of the International Prototype of the Kilogram (a specific platinum/iridium cylinder) and was intended to be of the same mass as the 1 litre of water referred to above. Additionally, the mass–volume relationship of water (as with any fluid) depends on temperature, pressure, purity and isotopic uniformity. In 1964, the definition relating the litre to mass was superseded by the current one. Although the litre is not an SI unit, it is accepted by the CGPM (the standards body that defines the SI) for use with the SI. CGPM defines the litre and its acceptable symbols.

A litre is equal in volume to the millistere, an obsolete non-SI metric unit formerly customarily used for dry measure.

Explanation

Litres are most commonly used for items (such as fluids and solids that can be poured) which are measured by the capacity or size of their container, whereas cubic metres (and derived units) are most commonly used for items measured either by their dimensions or their displacements. The litre is often also used in some calculated measurements, such as density (kg/L), allowing an easy comparison with the density of water.

One litre of water has a mass of almost exactly one kilogram when measured at its maximal density, which occurs at about 4 °C. It follows, therefore, that 1000th of a litre, known as one millilitre (1 mL), of water has a mass of about 1 g; 1000 litres of water has a mass of about 1000 kg (1 tonne or megagram). This relationship holds because the gram was originally defined as the mass of 1 mL of water; however, this definition was abandoned in 1799 because the density of water changes with temperature and, very slightly, with pressure.

It is now known that the density of water also depends on the isotopic ratios of the oxygen and hydrogen atoms in a particular sample.

SI prefixes applied to the litre

The litre, though not an official SI unit, may be used with SI prefixes. The most commonly used derived unit is the millilitre, defined as one-thousandth of a litre, and also often referred to by the SI derived unit name "cubic centimetre". It is a commonly used measure, especially in medicine, cooking and automotive engineering. Other units may be found in the table below, where the more often used terms are in bold. However, some authorities advise against some of them; for example, in the United States, NIST advocates using the millilitre or litre instead of the centilitre. There are two international standard symbols for the litre: L and l. In the United States the former is preferred because of the risk that (in some fonts) the letter  and the digit  may be confused.

Non-metric conversions

See also Imperial units and US customary units.

Rough conversions

One litre is slightly larger than a US liquid quart and slightly less than an imperial quart or one US dry quart. A mnemonic for its volume relative to an imperial pint is "a litre of water's a pint and three-quarters"; this is very close, as a litre is actually 1.75975399 pints.

A cubic foot has an exact volume of 28.316846592 litres.

Symbol

Originally, the only symbol for the litre was l (lowercase letter L), following the SI convention that only those unit symbols that abbreviate the name of a person start with a capital letter. In many English-speaking countries, however, the most common shape of a handwritten Arabic digit 1 is just a vertical stroke; that is, it lacks the upstroke added in many other cultures. Therefore, the digit "1" may easily be confused with the letter "l". In some computer typefaces, the two characters are barely distinguishable.  As a result, L (uppercase letter L) was adopted by the CIPM as an alternative symbol for litre in 1979. The United States National Institute of Standards and Technology now recommends the use of the uppercase letter L, a practice that is also widely followed in Canada and Australia. In these countries, the symbol L is also used with prefixes, as in mL and μL, instead of the traditional ml and μl used in Europe. In the UK and Ireland, as well as the rest of Europe, lowercase l is used with prefixes, though whole litres are often written in full (so, "750 ml" on a wine bottle, but often "1 litre" on a juice carton). In 1990, the International Committee for Weights and Measures stated that it was too early to choose a single symbol for the litre.

Script l  
Prior to 1979, the symbol  came into common use in some countries; for example, it was recommended by South African Bureau of Standards publication M33 and Canada in the 1970s. This symbol can still be encountered occasionally in some English-speaking and European countries like Germany, and its use is ubiquitous in Japan and South Korea.

Fonts covering the CJK characters usually include not only the script small  but also four precomposed characters:  for the microlitre, millilitre, decilitre and kilolitre to allow correct rendering for vertically written scripts. These have Unicode equivalents for compatibility, which are not recommended for use with new documents:

History
The first name of the litre was "cadil"; standards are shown at the Musée des Arts et Métiers in Paris.

The litre was introduced in France in 1795 as one of the new "republican units of measurement" and defined as one cubic decimetre.
One litre of liquid water has a mass of almost exactly one kilogram, due to the gram being defined in 1795 as one cubic centimetre of water at the temperature of melting ice.
The original decimetre length was 44.344 lignes, which was revised in 1798 to 44.3296 lignes. This made the original litre  of today's cubic decimetre. It was against this litre that the kilogram was constructed.

In 1879, the CIPM adopted the definition of the litre, with the symbol l (lowercase letter L).

In 1901, at the 3rd CGPM conference, the litre was redefined as the space occupied by 1 kg of pure water at the temperature of its maximum density (3.98 °C) under a pressure of 1 atm.

In 1964, at the 12th CGPM conference, the original definition was reverted to, and thus the litre was once again defined in exact relation to the metre, as another name for the cubic decimetre, that is, exactly 1 dm3.

In 1979, at the 16th CGPM conference, the alternative symbol L (uppercase letter L) was adopted. It also expressed a preference that in the future only one of these two symbols should be retained, but in 1990 said it was still too early to do so.

Everyday usage
In spoken English, the symbol "mL" (for millilitre) can be pronounced as "mil". This can potentially cause confusion with some other measurement words such as:
 "mm" for millimetre, a unit of length equal to one-thousandth of a metre
 "mil" for thousandth of an inch
 "mil", a Scandinavian unit of length equal to 10 kilometres
 "mil", unit of angular measurement

The abbreviation "cc" (for cubic centimetre, equal to a millilitre or mL) is a unit of the cgs system, which preceded the MKS system, which later evolved into the SI system. The abbreviation "cc" is still commonly used in many fields, including medical dosage and sizing for combustion engine displacement.

The microlitre (μL) has been known in the past as the lambda (λ), but this usage is now discouraged. In the medical field the microlitre is sometimes abbreviated as mcL on test results.

In the SI system, apart from prefixes for powers of 1000, use of the "centi" (10−2), "deci" (10−1), "deca" (10+1) and "hecto" (10+2) prefixes with litres is common. For example, in many European countries, the hectolitre is the typical unit for production and export volumes of beverages (milk, beer, soft drinks, wine, etc.) and for measuring the size of the catch and quotas for fishing boats; decilitres are common in Croatia, Switzerland and Scandinavia and often found in cookbooks, and restaurant and café menus; centilitres indicate the capacity of drinking glasses and of small bottles. In colloquial Dutch in Belgium, a "" and a "" (literally "twenty-fiver" and "thirty-threer") are the common beer glasses, the corresponding bottles mention 25 cL and 33 cL. Bottles may also be 75 cL or half size at 37.5 cL for "artisanal" brews or 70 cL for wines or spirits. Cans come in 25 cL, 33 cL and 50 cL. Similarly, alcohol shots are often marked in cL in restaurant menus, typically .

In countries where the metric system was adopted as the official measuring system after the SI standard was established, common usage eschews prefixes that are not powers of 1000. For example, in Canada, Australia, and New Zealand, consumer beverages are labelled almost exclusively using litres and millilitres. An exception is in pathology, where for instance blood lead level and blood sugar level may be measured in micrograms/milligrams per decilitre.

For larger volumes, kilolitres, megalitres, and gigalitres, have been used by the Northern Territory Government for measuring water consumption, reservoir capacities and river flows, although cubic metres are also used. Cubic metres are generally used for non-liquid commodities, such as sand and gravel, or storage space.

See also
 Acre-foot
 Claude Émile Jean-Baptiste Litre
 Integrated nanolitre system

Notes

References

Bibliography
 
 Bureau International des Poids et Mesures. (2006). "The International System of Units (SI)" (on-line browser):
Table 6 (Non-SI units accepted for use with the International System). Retrieved 2008-08-24
 
 National Institute of Standards and Technology. (December 2003). The NIST Reference on Constants, Units, and Uncertainty: International System of Units (SI) (web site):
 Note on SI units. Retrieved 2008-08-24.
 Recommending uppercase letter L. Retrieved 2008-08-24.
 Taylor, B.N. and Thompson, A. (Eds.). (2008a). The International System of Units (SI) . United States version of the English text of the eighth edition (2006) of the International Bureau of Weights and Measures publication Le Système International d' Unités (SI) (Special Publication 330). Gaithersburg, MD: National Institute of Standards and Technology. Retrieved 2008-08-18.
 Taylor, B.N. and Thompson, A. (2008b). Guide for the Use of the International System of Units (Special Publication 811). Gaithersburg, MD: National Institute of Standards and Technology. Retrieved 2008-08-23.
 Turner, J. (Deputy Director of the National Institute of Standards and Technology). (16 May 2008)."Interpretation of the International System of Units (the Metric System of Measurement) for the United States". Federal Register Vol. 73, No. 96, p. 28432-3.
 UK National Physical Laboratory. Non-SI Units

Alcohol measurement
Non-SI metric units
Units of volume
Cooking weights and measures